Bifericeras is a Lower Jurassic ammonite  belonging to the family Eoderoceratidae, and sometimes placed in the subfamily Xipherceratinae. Whorls are strongly depressed, but still evolute in coiling. The early growth state is prolonged, and smooth, followed by a late growth stage with rounded, straight, bituberculate ribs.

Bifericeras was named by Buckman in 1913 and is found in Europe.

Biostratigraphic significance
The International Commission on Stratigraphy (ICS) has assigned the First Appearance Datum of Bifericeras donovani and of genus Apoderoceras the defining biological marker for the start of the Pliensbachian Stage of the Jurassic, 190.8 ± 1.0 million years ago.

Distribution
Only found at Dimmer Camp, Castle Cary, Somerset.

References
Notes

Bibliography
Arkell et al., 1957. Mesozoic Ammonoidea, in Treatise on Invertebrate Paleontology, (Part L); Geological Soc. of America and University of Kansas press. 
Donovan, D.T. Callomon and Howarth 1981 Classification of the Jurassic Ammonitina; Systematics Association. 

Jurassic ammonites
Early Jurassic ammonites of Europe
Fossil taxa described in 1913